Judy is a 1956 studio album by Judy Garland, her second LP on the Capitol label, arranged by Nelson Riddle.

Track listing
 "Come Rain or Come Shine" (Harold Arlen, Johnny Mercer)
 "Just Imagine" (Ray Henderson, Lew Brown, Buddy DeSylva)
 "I Feel a Song Coming On" (Dorothy Fields, Jimmy McHugh, George Oppenheimer)
 "Last Night When We Were Young" (Arlen, Yip Harburg)
 "Life Is Just a Bowl of Cherries" (Ray Henderson, Lew Brown)
 "April Showers" (Louis Silvers, DeSylva)
 "I'm Old Fashioned" (Jerome Kern, Johnny Mercer) – 3:23
 "Maybe I'll Come Back" (as "I Will Come Back") (Charles C. Cook, Howard Jeffrey)
 "Dirty Hands, Dirty Face" (James V. Monaco, Al Jolson, Grant Clarke, Edgar Leslie)
 "Lucky Day" (Henderson, Brown, DeSylva)
 "Memories of You" (Eubie Blake, Andy Razaf)
 "Any Place I Hang My Hat Is Home" (Arlen, Mercer)
 Studio outtakes not included on the original 1956 release:

Personnel

Performance
Judy Garland - vocals
Nelson Riddle - conductor, arranger

LP design
Bob Willoughby - photographs

CD reissue
When the album was released on CD in 1989, "I'm Old Fashioned" (Jerome Kern, Johnny Mercer) was added as a bonus track. The song title of track 8 was corrected to "Maybe I'll Come Back," credited to Charles L. Cooke and Howard C. Jeffrey.

References

1956 albums
Judy Garland albums
Capitol Records albums
Albums arranged by Nelson Riddle
Albums produced by Nelson Riddle
Albums conducted by Nelson Riddle